Teucer is a legendary character in the Homeric tradition. The name may be:

 Teucer, the bowman, half-brother of Ajax
 King Teucer, founder of Dardania
 Teucer of Babylon, an astrologer of Egyptian Babylon
 2797 Teucer, an asteroid
 Caligo teucer, a species of butterfly